Syllepte christophalis is a moth in the family Crambidae. It was described by Viette in 1988. It is found on La Réunion.

References

Moths described in 1988
christophalis
Moths of Africa